The Svijany Open is a professional tennis tournament played on outdoor red clay courts. It is currently part of the Association of Tennis Professionals (ATP) Challenger Tour. It is held annually at the Liberec Tennis Club in Liberec, Czech Republic since 2013.

Past finals

Singles

Doubles

External links
ITF Search

 
ATP Challenger Tour
Clay court tennis tournaments
Tennis tournaments in the Czech Republic